Tarah Gieger (born September 18, 1985) is a Puerto Rican female professional motocross racer.

Early years
Gieger's parents moved to Puerto Rico from Florida, where they established a surf shop. Gieger was born in Aguadilla, Puerto Rico. She began practising surfing, but switched to motorcycles when she was 10 years old. She began riding them in the mountains of San Sebastián where crowds gather to practice.

Professional career
In 2003, Gieger began racing professionally. Gieger won Loretta Lynn AMA Amateur National Motocross Championship titles in 2004, 2006, and 2007.  Also in 2007, she became the first female racer ever to compete in the Motocross des Nations.  In 2008, Gieger won the first women's supercross event at the X Games XIV.

The following year, a broken wrist prevented Gieger from being among the medalists of the X Games. On March 2010, she joined the Troy Lee Design/Lucas Oil/Honda motocross racing team. After that, she won the silver medal at the women's supercross event at the X Games for two years in a row (2010 and 2011).

In 2013, Gieger finished fourth in the Ford Women's Enduro X Final at the X Games Barcelona. That same year, she was photographed nude for ESPN:The Magazine "Bodies We Want" photo shoot.

Gieger, is the most decorated female athlete in X Games history.

Personal life
Gieger married fellow Nitro Circus member Dusty Wygle on March 10, 2017.

See also
List of Puerto Ricans

References

External links
ESPN interview

1985 births
Puerto Rican motocross riders
Female motorcycle racers
People from Aguadilla, Puerto Rico
Puerto Rican sportswomen
X Games athletes
Living people